The Ciskei National Independence Party (CNIP) was a political party in the nominally independent South African homeland of Ciskei. It was founded and led by Lennox Sebe. The party advocated cooperation with the South African government. The party governed Ciskei from 1973 until the 1990 coup d'état by Oupa Gqozo.

Electoral history 
 1978: CNIP won all 50 elected seats (a further 87 seats were filled by chiefs appointed ex-officio by the government)
 1984: CNIP was deemed to won the election unopposed, as its 23 candidates were the only ones to register

References 

Defunct political parties in South Africa
Organisations associated with apartheid
Political parties with year of disestablishment missing
Political parties with year of establishment missing
Politics of Ciskei